Andreas Schwarz (born 3 March 1965) is a German politician of the Social Democratic Party (SPD) who has been serving as a member of the Bundestag from the state of Bavaria since 2013.

Political career 
Schwarz became a member of the Bundestag in the 2013 German federal election.

In his first term from 2013 until 2017, Schwarz served on the Finance Committee. Since 2018, he has been a member of the Budget Committee and the Audit Committee. In this capacity, he serves as the SPD parliamentary group's rapporteur on the annual budget of the Federal Ministry of Defence. Since 2022, he has been a member of the so-called Confidential Committee (Vertrauensgremium) of the Budget Committee, which provides budgetary supervision for Germany's three intelligence services, BND, BfV and MAD. Also 2022, he joined the parliamentary body charged with overseeing a 100 billion euro special fund to strengthen Germany's armed forces.

Other activities 
 German United Services Trade Union (ver.di), Member

References

External links 

  
 Bundestag biography 

1965 births
Living people
Members of the Bundestag for Bavaria
Members of the Bundestag 2021–2025
Members of the Bundestag 2017–2021
Members of the Bundestag 2013–2017
Members of the Bundestag for the Social Democratic Party of Germany
People from Siegen-Wittgenstein